Anklam-Land is an Amt in the district of Vorpommern-Greifswald, in Mecklenburg-Vorpommern, Germany. The seat of the Amt is in Spantekow.

The Amt Anklam-Land consists of the following municipalities:

Ämter in Mecklenburg-Western Pomerania